Billy “Catfish” Parker (born January 9, 1977) is a former NASCAR Busch Series driver.  He is the younger brother of Busch series veteran Hank Parker Jr. and son of professional fisherman Hank Parker. Parker comes from running both dirt and asphalt across the south after getting his start in Go-Karts.

In 8 Busch starts in 2004 in the No. 66 Duraflame Dodge fielded by Rusty Wallace, Inc., he had a best start of 11th at California and a best finish of 22nd also at California Speedway, while having four DNFs.

Motorsports career results

NASCAR
(key) (Bold – Pole position awarded by qualifying time. Italics – Pole position earned by points standings or practice time. * – Most laps led.)

Busch Series

References

External links
 NASCAR driver profile
 

Living people
1977 births
People from Denver, North Carolina
Racing drivers from North Carolina
NASCAR drivers
American Speed Association drivers